Chantalle Ng (born 17 June 1995) is a Singaporean actress.

Early life and education
Ng is the daughter of Mediacorp artiste Lin Meijiao and former actor Huang Yiliang. The couple divorced in 1997 when Ng was only a few months old. Ng studied at Ai Tong School, Presbyterian High School, Nanyang Polytechnic and Singapore Management University. She graduated from Singapore Management University with a Bachelor of Science degree in Information Systems in April 2019.

During an interview on talkshow "Hear U Out" in 2021, Ng revealed about her relationship with actor Huang Yiliang while she grew up. While Ng enjoyed playing sports with Huang, Ng revealed about an incident with excessive hard canings that left her in hospital for a week, leading to it being a police case. Even though the charges were eventually dropped, Ng cut off contact with him. After that programme was shown, on 26 September 2021, Huang responded to the allegations on Facebook live, saying that his heart was "ripped to shreds", adding that he doted on her and that Ng should not have revealed these incidents. Huang added that he excused Ng from the proceedings when he spoke, alleging that three days before the beatings, Lin Meijiao told Huang to play the bad cop, while Lin was the good cop and that the canes were used as scare tactics.

Career 
Ng signed a contract with Mediacorp in May 2019. Prior to her university and graduation, Ng was already involved in a few Channel 8 productions, playing supporting roles in 96 °C Café and World At Your Feet.

In 2017, Ng clinched the Star Awards Best Newcomer with her stellar performance in While We Are Young. Her performance has propelled her to her first leading role Coco in the Chinese drama The Distance Between which was entirely filmed in Western Australia.

Ng started her own business in 2020 with Minying Wong, selling collagen soup under the brand Yuan Collagen.

Filmography

Television series

Film

Compilation album

Awards and nominations

References

External links 
 Chantalle Ng profile on The Celebrity Agency

1995 births
21st-century Singaporean actresses
Living people
Singaporean television actresses
Singapore Management University alumni
Nanyang Polytechnic alumni